is a Japanese manga series written and illustrated by Tokihiko Matsuura. It was published in Shogakukan's Weekly Shōnen Sunday from 1997 to 2000, with its chapters collected in 15 tankōbon volumes. In North America, it was licensed for English released by Viz Media. The series is about a teenaged boxer named Ginji Kusanagi who is reincarnated as a penguin in order to be close to the girl he likes. On August 4, 2011, Walt Disney Pictures and Viz Pictures announced they were adapting the Tuxedo Gin manga into a feature film under the name, Tux.

Plot
An angel (who is depicted as a Buddhist monk with cherub wings and halo) tells Ginji that because of a celestial mistake, he can be reunited with Minako, but only if he lives out the natural lifespan of another animal, after which he will return to his human body. Remembering Minako's love for penguins, Ginji decides to be reincarnated as an Adelie penguin, and he hatches from an egg in a Tokyo aquarium.

When Ginji reaches adolescence, he escapes from the aquarium with his penguin friends, only to discover he cannot swim. He washes up in the harbor, where he is discovered by Minako. She takes him home and names him Gin-chan (at first thinking this to be an affectionate contraction of his own name, Ginji is crestfallen when Minako reveals that she has selected this name because, in her words, "You're such a cute little ".

The series depicts Ginji's life with Minako, where he does his best to protect Minako from any man who tries to go out with her or simply "harm" her. Along the way, Mike and the other penguins from the aquarium help him once in a while and he meets fellow reincarnated humans.

In the final arc, Minako is kidnapped by a murderous criminal named Kurosaki and Ginji goes and rescues her, but at the cost of losing his ability to fully reincarnate. Minako loses her memory and believes that Gin-chan headed back to the North Pole to be with his kind. The angel, becoming sympathetic to Ginji's ordeal, makes a plea to God to give up his form so that Ginji can be brought back to life. Ginji reunites with a relieved Minako and they become a couple while adopting a penguin named Popo whom Ginji had befriended earlier.

Manga
Tuxedo Gin was published by Shogakukan in Weekly Shōnen Sunday from March 26, 1997 to January 29, 2000 and collected in 15 tankōbon volumes. It is published North America in English by Viz Communications, with all 15 volumes released, and in Vietnam by TVM Comics.

Volume list

Reception

Tuxedo Gin has been reviewed as having the sort of wacky premise and serious plotlines that make a good romantic comedy, unfortunately being weakened by mediocre characters. Tokihiko Matsuura's art has been praised for clean lines and clear layouts but criticized for its generic character designs.

References

External links
 Viz Media official site
 

1997 manga
Animated television series about penguins
Romantic comedy anime and manga
Science fiction anime and manga
Shogakukan manga
Shōnen manga
Viz Media manga